Sunstar or Sun Star may refer to:

Astronomy 

The Sun

Newspapers 

 Merced Sun-Star in California, United States
 Sun Star (Alaska), a student newspaper in Alaska, United States
 SunStar in the Philippines
 SunStar Cebu
 SunStar Davao

Sea stars 

 Solaster stimpsoni, a sea star
 Solaster dawsoni, a sea star
 Sunflower sea star, a sea star

Other 
 Sunstar (photography), an optical phenomenon found on photos of bright objects taken with a small aperture
 Sunstar (racehorse), a British racehorse
 Ornithogalum dubium, a flowering plant
 Sunflower starfish (Pycnopodia helianthoides), also known as the sun star or sunflower star
 Sunstar Group, global health and beauty, chemical, and motorcycle parts conglomerate
 Sunstar, a character from Mega Man V

Animal common name disambiguation pages